Shozo Makino may refer to:
Shōzō Makino (director)
Shozo Makino (swimmer)